Thomas Bruns (born 7 January 1992) is a Dutch professional footballer who plays as a central midfielder for Heracles Almelo.

Club career

Heracles Almelo
Born in Wierden, Bruns is a product of the local youth academy (Dutch source), which since 2020 has developed into an equal venture between Heracles Almelo and FC Twente. Bruns left the Hengelo-based institute in 2011 to join Eredivisie side Heracles Almelo. A couple of months after joining the club, Bruns finally made his debut on 9 April 2011, in Heracles' 6–2 away victory against Willem II, replacing Everton in the 79th minute. The following season, Bruns scored his first league goal for Heracles, in their 4–2 home defeat against Heerenveen. After a couple of seasons at the club, Bruns finally became a regular in the starting eleven, during Heracles' 2014–15 campaign, making twenty-nine starts and netting seven times.

Vitesse
On 10 April 2017, it was announced that Bruns would join Vitesse on a free transfer, at the end of the 2016–17 campaign upon the expiry of his current contract at Heracles.

FC Groningen
On 24 December 2018, it was announced that Bruns would join fellow Eredivisie side Groningen on loan for the remainder of the campaign as of 1 January 2019.

Adanaspor
On 12 August 2021, he joined Adanaspor in Turkey on a two-year contract.

Return to Heracles Almelo
On 3 August 2022, Bruns returned to Heracles Almelo and signed a three-year contract.

Career statistics

References

External links
 
 

1992 births
People from Wierden
Footballers from Overijssel
Living people
Dutch footballers
Association football midfielders
Netherlands youth international footballers
Netherlands under-21 international footballers
FC Twente players
Heracles Almelo players
SBV Vitesse players
FC Groningen players
PEC Zwolle players
VVV-Venlo players
Adanaspor footballers
Eredivisie players
Eerste Divisie players
TFF First League players
Dutch expatriate footballers
Expatriate footballers in Turkey
Dutch expatriate sportspeople in Turkey